This is a list of Spanish television related events in 2006.

Events 
 15 February: Regional Channel Canal Extremadura Televisión starts broadcasting.
 27 March: Nationwide TV Channel La Sexta starts broadcasting.
 14 April: Regional Channel 7 Región de Murcia starts broadcasting.
 21 April: Regional Channel Aragón Televisión starts broadcasting.
 2 June: Telecinco purchases 15% shares of Miramón Mendi, property of José Luis Moreno.
 5 June: The Parliament of Spain passes the New State-owned Television and Radio Act.
 October: Libertad Digital TV Channel starts broadcasting.
 28 October: 50 anniversary of TVE, and henceforth television in Spain.

Debuts

Television shows

Ending this year

Changes of network affiliation

Foreign series debuts in Spain

Deaths 
 30 January - Lola Cardona, actress, 70.
 25 March - Rocío Dúrcal, singer, 61.
 27 May - Alfonso Lussón, actor, 65.
 1 June - Rocío Jurado, singer, 61.
 7 August - Ángel de Andrés, actor, 88.
 6 November - Mara Goyanes, actress, 64.
 9 December - Lauren Postigo, host, 78.
 16 December - Enric Arredondo, actor, 66.

See also
 2006 in Spain
 List of Spanish films of 2006

References 

2006 in Spanish television